Margao or Madgaon is the commercial capital of the Indian state of Goa. It stands on banks of the Sal river and is the administrative headquarters of Salcete sub-district and South Goa district. It is Goa's second largest city by population after Vasco.

Etymology 
The etymology of the name has been debated, with theories ranging from the name having evolved from the pre-colonial Mahargao (“village of Mahars”, a large community of weavers) to being derived from the Sanskrit  (Maṭhagrāma) which means "a village of monasteries" owing to the shrines of Matsyendranath and Gorakhnath in Ravanphond, now a suburb of Margao.

Alternatively Margão may be derived from Mharuganv, “village of demons”, or Maravile, Portuguese for “marvellous village.”

History 
Margao in pre-Portuguese times was one of the important settlements in Salcete and known as Matha Grama (the village of Mathas) as it was a temple town with nine Mathas in temple schools. Its replacement in 1579 was destroyed by raiders. The present church was built in 1675.

While the western side of the Holy Spirit Church developed as a market place, the settlement grew on the eastern side, that is, the Borda region.

Câmara Municipal de Salcete
The Municipality during the erstwhile Portuguese regime was known as "Câmara Municipal de Salcete", catering to all the villages in Salcete Taluka for over 300 years until the Goa Municipalities Act of 1968 came into force. The Câmara Municipal de Salcete is now reconstituted into Margao Municipal Council. The Members of the Câmara Municipal de Salcete were then nominated by the Government, but after the reconstitution of the Municipal Council, the Members to all the 25 wards (13 in Margao & 12 in Fatorda) are elected by the Members of the council.

Margao's importance as an administrative and commercial area grew with the increasing dependence of the surrounding towns and villages; leading to the administrative center with the town hall at its center being built in the south.

In 1961, Annexation of Goa led to its incorporation into the Republic of India, and Margao was declared as the administrative center of the district of South Goa.

Geography

Topography

Nestled on the banks of the Sal River, Portuguese style mansions dot its landscape. One of the fastest growing cities in Goa, its fast growing suburbs include Aquem, Fatorda, Gogol, Borda, Comba, Navelim and Davorlim.

Climate
Margao features a tropical monsoon climate. Summers are warm whereas winters are mild. Monsoons occur from June–September with heavy rainfall and gusty winds.

Demographics

As of the 2011 census of India, Margao had a population of 87,650. Males constituted 51% of the population and females 49%. It had an average literacy rate of 90%; male literacy was 93%, and female literacy 86.8%. In Margao, 9.8% of the population was under 7 years of age. With a population of 106,484 in the metropolitan area, Margao is second largest Urban agglomeration in Goa.

Languages
Konkani is the most widely spoken language in Margao, followed closely by English. Portuguese is still spoken and understood by a small number of people. Hindi is also spoken and understood by a majority of the city's population as a language to converse with non-konkani, non-English speaking people. The dialect of Konkani in South Goa differs notably from that spoken in North Goa. Marathi is also understood to a significant level. A sizable fraction of the flower and vegetable merchants converse in Kannada.

Government and politics
Margao is part of Margao (Goa Assembly constituency) and South Goa (Lok Sabha constituency).

Culture/Cityscape
The city is also claimed as the cultural capital of Goa. A cultural center named 'Ravindra Bhavan' was inaugurated by the then Chief Minister of Goa, Digambar Kamat in July 2008 at Fatorda which is also an Official Venue For International Film Festival of India  . It also has Goa's biggest sports stadium, the Nehru Stadium at Fatorda. The Akhil Bharatiya Marathi Sahitya Sammelan was held in 1964.

Some of the theatres in Margao include the Gomant Vidya Niketan, OSIA Multiplex, Vishant and Lata; in addition to Goa's biggest theater, the Metropole. Inox has recently launched a multiplex with a capacity of 904 seats. The Gomat Vidya Niketan is a premier centre for arts in the town.

People from all over Goa congregate at the special market to buy spices and dried fish to be used during the oncoming rainy season.

The usual specialities that are found in the cuisine of Goa are also to be found in Margao. The curry of Margao is a praised local speciality. Cans of curry of Margao are currently exported to Portugal and elsewhere.

Margao is also the name of a brand of spices sold in Portugal.

Tourism

The town has many sights and destinations. These include the Mercado de Afonso de Albuquerque which roughly translates to closed market and colloquially known as   "Pimplapedd" or "Pimpalakatta", the municipal building (Câmara Municipal), the municipal garden named after benefactor Prince Aga Khan, Anna Fonte (natural springs), Old Market or Mercado Velho, Holy Spirit Church, grand colonial mansions such as the Seven Gables House, the chapel at Monte Hill.

Some of the town suburbs include Pajifond, Aquem, Gogol, Borda, Malbhat, Madel, Kharebandh, Old Market, Navelim and Comba, the last two being the oldest parts of the town.

Pandava Caves Located in Aquem Behind St. Sebestian Church

There are a number of temples and churches in Margao city The famous churches in Margao are the Holy Spirit Church, the Grace Church, The St Sebastian Church in Aquem (The Old St. Sebastian Chapel, popularly known as the Pandava Copel still stands next to the modern St. Sebastian Church) and the Monte Hill Chapel. The famous temples are the 'Damodar Temple' (Saal), the 'Hari Mandir', the 'Maruti Mandir' at Davorlim the 'Saibaba Temple' at Davorlim, the 'Shiv Temple' (Ling) at Fatorda near Nehru Stadium (which is the original Temple of Damodara). There are two mosques in Margao, one in the Malbhat area and one on the Monte hill. There is also a Jain temple and a Jama'at Khana for the Khoja faith in Pajifond. There is also a Muslim community of Nizaris living in Margao.

Landmarks

Municipal Garden 
In the centre of the town is the Municipal Garden, known as Praça Jorge Barreto, around which most restaurants and office buildings are located. On the park's south side like the colonial style red-washed Municipal building, known as Margao Town Hall which was built in 1905, and the Library. The northern segment of the Municipal garden was developed by the Mavany family and is named after His Highness Prince Shah Karim Al Hussaini, Aga Khan IV/Imam of Nizari Ismaili Muslims who visited Goa just before its liberation. The entire garden is now municipal property and is maintained by the Margao Municipal Council.

The Holy Spirit Church 
The Largo de Igreja, or the Church of the Holy Spirit, was built by the Portuguese in 1675 and boasts a pristine white façade and an interior dripping with gilt crystal and stucco. The Municipal Garden square is defined on one side by the church with its baroque architecture and the parochial house, and on the other side by the palatial mansions of affluent elite Catholics, positioned in a row. The Associação das Communidades (Communities Association) building and the school being the odd exceptions which add to its character and sense of scale. They have a maximum height of two stories, and balcões balconies and varandas (verandas) facing the square. Parallel to the church square is the commercial street (old market). There is also a landscaped area next to the church called Praça da Alegria (Joy Square). The church feast is celebrated before the monsoons, it is a time when many residents make pre-monsoon purchases to stock up for a prolonged rainy season.

House of Seven Gables 
Just within walking distance of the Holy Spirit Church, is the famous "House of Seven Gables" or "Sat Burzam Ghor". This magnificent mansion was built by Inacio Sebastiao da Silva, emissary and private secretary of the Portuguese Viceroy, in 1790. Today, only three of the seven gables remain. The family church with its Baroque and Rococo workmanship, exhibits the loftiness of the Portuguese time.

Narcinva D. Naik residence and Damodar Sal 
The Narcinva D. Naik residence houses Margao's well-known temple-hall known as Damodar Sal or Dambaba Saal. The house played host to Swami Vivekananda during his visit to Goa in October 1892 before proceeding to Chicago to address the Parliament of Religions

Transport

By Air
The nearest airport to Margao is Goa's international airport ( Dabolim Airport ) which is 23 km away.

By Rail
Madgaon railway station is a railway junction positioned at the intersection of the Konkan Railway and the South Western Railway (Guntakal–Vasco da Gama section) and is Goa's busiest. Due to its location and connectivity, the station is often used as a transit stop by many people who either head off down south to popular tourist destinations such as Palolem (38 km) or to Benaulim and Colva .

Margao hosted the test track for the Skybus Metro project, an elevated rail system patented by the Konkan Railway Corporation, This project was allegedly scrapped due to an accident which occurred during the test drive killing one engineer and seriously injuring three crew members. B Rajaram who had invented the rail system has stated that in his opinion the accident was avoidable.

By Road
Margao is connected by road to other cities like Mangalore, Udupi, Bhatkal, Kumta, Karwar, Ratnagiri, and Mumbai through the National Highway 66 (NH66). Also, there is road which connects Margao to Ponda, São José de Areal, Sanvordem, Chandor, and other towns of Goa state.

Education

Margao is home to many schools and colleges, the alumni of which have made significant contributions to Goa's cultural and scientific landscape. Most schools function in accordance with the curriculum prescribed by the Directorate of Education and the Goa Board of Secondary and Higher Secondary Education.The oldest, the Loyola High School (Goa) near the Old Bus Stand, is a Jesuit-run school. Other schools include Bhatikar Model English High School (established in 1935) named after its founder Late Pandurang Raya Bhatikar and Mahila & Nutan High School which was established as Samaj Seva Sangh's Mahila Vidyalay for girls in 1933 and started co-ed intake in June 1972. Manovikas English Medium School and Vidya Vikas Academy affiliated to the Council for the Indian School Certificate Examinations and Central Board of Secondary Education are highly sought after. The other educational institutes in Margao include St.Joseph High School at Aquem, Govt. High School Vidyanagar, Holy Spirit Institute, Presentation Convent High School, Fatima Convent High School, Perpetual Convent High School located in Navelim, and Popular High School in Comba near police station.

The colleges in Margao include The Parvatibai Chowgule College which was housed in Portuguese Military Barracks opposite Multipurpose High School in Vidyanagar. The college moved to its present location in 1972 under the direction of then principal P. S. Rege. Shree Damodar College of Commerce and Economics and Govind Ramnath Kare College of Law provide post secondary education in Commerce and Law respectively. Schools such as Shree Damodar Higher Secondary School Of Science and R.M.S Higher Secondary School focus exclusively on higher secondary education. There are also ITIs (Industrial Training Institutes) which impart technical education. Don Bosco College of Engineering located at Fatorda is the sole technical degree granting institute in the town.

Gallery

See also

References

External links
 
 

 
Cities and towns in South Goa district